Private Life may refer to:

life in the private sphere
Private Life (1982 film), a Soviet film
Private Life (2018 film), an American film
"Private Life" (song), written by Chrissie Hynde, and released by The Pretenders and Grace Jones in 1980
"Private Life", song released by Oingo Boingo on Nothing to Fear in 1982
Private Life: The Compass Point Sessions, a 1998 compilation album by Grace Jones

See also 

His Private Life (1926 film), an American silent comedy starring Lupino Lane
His Private Life (1928 film), an American silent comedy starring Adolphe Menjou
Her Private Life, a 1929 American drama film
Private Lives (disambiguation)